This is a list of public holidays in Saint Barthélemy.

In addition, like other French Caribbean territories, private sector often take these holidays (jour chômé d'usage in France) which are not official holidays.

References

Lists of public holidays by country
Saint Barthélemy culture
Saint Barthélemy
Saint Barthélemy